Sam Thomson (born 23 January 1994) is a Scottish rugby union player. He currently plays in Japan for Toshiba Brave Lupus in the Top League competition. His usual position is at lock.

Early life and career
Born in Edinburgh, Scotland, Thomson was raised in Glasgow where he attended Kelvinside Academy. He represented Glasgow District at U15, U16 and U17 age grades.

He moved south to England where he played with Lydney RFC and attended the University of Worcester. He utilised the training link that the university had with Worcester Warriors, and also played for the Scottish Exiles U18s while based in England.

Thomson then moved to New Zealand for six months where he played for Southbridge Rugby Club, an amateur club in the Canterbury Rugby Football Union, famous for being Dan Carter's first club.

Rugby career

France
In the 2015–16 season Thomson signed for Perpignan to play in their academy. He played in the Espoir competition for the French side but never played in the Pro D2.

Scotland
Thomson enrolled in the BT Sport Scottish Rugby Academy in 2016–17 as a Stage 3 player. Stage 3 players are assigned to a professional club and Thomson has been assigned to Glasgow Warriors for the 2016–17 season. When not on Warriors duty, he played for Glasgow Hawks.

Thomson made his debut for the Warriors in the pre-season match against Canada 'A' on 30 August 2016. He made his Pro12 debut for the Warriors against Ulster on 23 September 2016 when he replaced Tjiuee Uanivi. After sustaining a shoulder injury in late 2016 that ended his season, he moved to Australia.

Australia
Joining the Warringah Rats on Sydney's Northern Beaches, Thomson played in the club's Shute Shield premiership-winning team of 2017. He played in the National Rugby Championship for the Greater Sydney Rams in 2017 NSW Country in 2018, and Sydney in 2019.

Japan
On 14 September 2020, Thomson makes move to Japan with Toshiba Brave Lupus on the Top League competition ahead of the 2020-21 season.

Life outside rugby
Thomson studied an outdoor leadership-based degree at Worcester University. He is a qualified canoe/kayak instructor, has passed mountain leader training and is white water safety and rescue qualified. After his rugby career finishes, Sam Thomson wants to join his father Bill Thomson—who played rugby for Scottish colleges—into the events, hospitality and tourism industry.

References

External links 
 Stats on It's rugby
 Glasgow v Canada 'A' match report, Americas Rugby News

1994 births
Living people
Scottish rugby union players
Glasgow Warriors players
Glasgow Hawks players
USA Perpignan players
Greater Sydney Rams players
New South Wales Country Eagles players
Edinburgh Rugby players
Scottish expatriates in New Zealand
Rugby union players from Edinburgh
Rugby union locks
Toshiba Brave Lupus Tokyo players
Hanazono Kintetsu Liners players
ACT Brumbies players